The following is a timeline of the history of the city of Cotonou, Benin.

Prior to 20th century

 1830 - Cotonou founded as a "slaving port."
 1878 - Cotonou "ceded to France."
 1883 - French occupation.
 1899 - Wharf built.

20th century

 1904 - Cotonou becomes part of colonial French Dahomey.
 1908 - Deepwater harbor opens.
 1912 - Cotonou becomes a "commune mixte."
 1920s - Population: 8,500.
 1928 - Ancien Pont (bridge) built.
 1955 - Catholic Metropolitan Archdiocese of Cotonou established.
 1957 - January: Pan-African General Union of Negro African Workers founded at a conference in Cotonou.
 1960s - Tomety photo studio in operation.
 1963
 Dantokpa Market established.
 Presidential Palace built.
 1964
 L'action populaire newspaper begins publication.
 Nigerian Yoruba Community-Cotonou organization formed.
 1965 - Port constructed.
 1967 - Les Muses theatre troupe formed.
 1968 - Orchestre Poly Rythmo de Cotonou (musical group) and Société Béninoise de Textiles established in Cotonou.
 1970 - Université du Dahomey founded.
 1975 - City becomes part of the People's Republic of Benin.
 1980 - Association des écrivains et critiques littéraires du Bénin founded.
 1981 - Population: 383,250 (estimate).
 1982 - Stade de l'Amitié (stadium) opens.
 1988 -  opens.
 1986 - Sister city relationship established with Salvador, Brazil.
 1990 - February: Benin constitutional conference held.
 1992 - Population: 536,827.
 1995
 Centre de conferences international opens.
 December: Meeting of the Organisation internationale de la Francophonie held in city.
 1996 - University of Science and Technology of Benin established.

21st century

 2001 - L'Informateur newspaper begins publication.
 2002 - Maison des Médias du Bénin founded.
 2003
 25 December: Airplane crash.
 Nicéphore Soglo becomes mayor.
 2005 -  (museum) opens.
 2009 - Population: 815,041.
 2011 - Population: 924,000.
 2013 - Population: 679,012.

References

This article incorporates information from the French Wikipedia and German Wikipedia.

Bibliography

in English

in French

External links

  (Bibliography of open access  articles)
  (Images, etc.)
  (Images, etc.)
  (Bibliography)
  (Bibliography)
  (Bibliography)

Cotonou
Cotonou
Years in Benin